The 2013 Lower Austrian state election was held on 3 March 2013 to elect the members of the Landtag of Lower Austria.

The Austrian People's Party (ÖVP) retained its majority. The main winner of the election was the new Team Stronach, which debuted at 9.8%. It drew votes from the ÖVP, Social Democratic Party of Austria (SPÖ) and Freedom Party of Austria (FPÖ).

Background
The Lower Austrian constitution mandates that cabinet positions in the state government (state councillors) be allocated between parties proportionally in accordance with the share of votes won by each; this is known as Proporz. As such, the government is a perpetual coalition of all parties that qualify for at least one state councillor. After the 2008 election, the ÖVP had six councillors, the SPÖ two, and the FPÖ one.

Electoral system
The 56 seats of the Landtag of Lower Austria are elected via open list proportional representation in a two-step process. The seats are distributed between twenty multi-member constituencies. For parties to receive any representation in the Landtag, they must either win at least one seat in a constituency directly, or clear a 4 percent state-wide electoral threshold. Seats are distributed in constituencies according to the Hare quota, with any remaining seats allocated using the D'Hondt method at the state level, to ensure overall proportionality between a party's vote share and its share of seats.

Contesting parties
The table below lists parties represented in the previous Landtag.

In addition to the parties already represented in the Landtag, five parties collected enough signatures to be placed on the ballot.

 Team Stronach (FRANK)
 Communist Party of Austria (KPÖ) – on the ballot only in 19 constituencies
 The Brave Citizens (MUT) – on the ballot only in 13 constituencies
 Christian Party of Austria – Centre Party (CPÖMP) – on the ballot only in 4 constituencies
 Pirate Party of Austria (PIRAT) – on the ballot only in 1 constituency

Results

Results by constituency

Preference votes
Alongside votes for a party, voters were able to cast a preferential votes for a candidate on the party list. The ten candidates with the most preferential votes were as follows:

Aftermath
The ÖVP retained its Landtag majority and six out of nine state councillors; the SPÖ also retained its two councillors. The FPÖ lost their sole state councillor to Team Stronach.

References

2013 elections in Austria
State elections in Austria
March 2013 events in Europe